Ritu Chhina is an actress and director known for her work in both film and television.

Early Life and Education
Chhina was born in India and grew up in Mumbai before moving to New Zealand and later to Cairns, where she attended Cairns State High School. During high school, she wrote an award-winning play about children during the Holocaust. She went on to study Law/Arts at the Queensland University of Technology, Film and TV at the SAE Institute, and act at the National Institute of Dramatic Art. She holds dual nationality as Indian and Australian and is a citizen of Australia.

Career
Chhina's career in the entertainment industry began with the short film "Karma," which she directed in 2012. She later appeared as the lead cast in the reality television show Take Me Out in 2018 and produced several short films in 2019. In 2020, she wrote and directed "Athena," a science-fiction proof-of-concept film, and appeared in the TV series "Assigned Female at Birth." In October 2021, Chhina made her mark on the entertainment world by appearing as the first bi-sexual bachelorette in the global franchise "The Bachelorette." In 2022, she was cast as the lead in the feature film "To."

Recognition

Actress
Her work has been recognized with several awards, including being a finalist and receiving an honorable mention at the Changing Face International Film Festival, Nosferatu Film Festival, London International Film Festival, and Sci-Fi & Fantasy: Genre Lab - Presented by Lift-Off Global Network.

Filmography

Actress

Editor and Director

References